The Kjeld Abell Prize is a Danish cultural award which is handed every second or third year to a person, who has made a great effort for Danish theatre or film.

The prize is handed by the Danish Academy, who runs the Kjeld Abell Memorial Foundation, which was founded just after his death in 1961. The prize is currently 50,000 DDK.

Recipients 
 1976: Jess Ørnsbo
 1978: Inger Christensen
 1980: Eugenio Barba
 1982: Finn Methling
 1983: Jørgen Leth
 1985: Ulla Ryum
 1987: Astrid Saalbach
 1989: Kirsten Delholm
 1991: Ernst Bruun Olsen
 1993: Lars von Trier and Niels Vørsel
 1995: Jens Kistrup
 1997: Morti Vizki
 2000: Peter Asmussen
 2003: Nullo Facchini
 2005: Claus Beck-Nielsen
 2007: Jokum Rohde
 2009: Line Knutzon
 2011: Nikoline Werdelin
 2015: Andreas Garfield

References 

Danish film awards